Harry Lees (28 April 1890 – 9 September 1964) was an Australian rules footballer who played with Collingwood in the Victorian Football League (VFL).

Notes

References
 The Collingwood Football Team, The Leader, (Saturday, 13 June 1908), p.26.

External links 

		
Harry Lees's profile at Collingwood Forever

1890 births
1964 deaths
VFL/AFL players born in England
Australian rules footballers from Victoria (Australia)
Collingwood Football Club players
English players of Australian rules football
English emigrants to Australia
Sportspeople from Ashton-under-Lyne